Sydaphera spengleriana, the Spengler's nutmeg, is a species of sea snail, a marine gastropod mollusk in the family Cancellariidae, the nutmeg snails.

Distribution
This species is widespread from Indonesia to Japan.

Description

Bibliography
 Jerome M. Eisenberg Jr., William E. Old - Collector's guide to Seashells of the World p 132/19
 R. Tucker Abbott, S. Peter Dance  - Compendium of Seashells p 226/1.3
Alain Robin - Encyclopedia of Marine Gastropods p 457/15
Encyclopédie Méthodique Vol. 2, p 185
Hamlyn Guide to Shells of the World p 262
Hemmen J. (2007) Recent Cancellariidae. Annotated and illustrated catalogue of Recent Cancellariidae. Privately published, Wiesbaden. 428 pp.
M.B. Pocket Guide to Shells of the World p 133

References

 Deshayes, G. P., 1830 Histoire naturelle des vers. In: Encyclopédie méthodique, vol. 2(1), p. 1-256
 Hemmen, J. (2007). Recent Cancellariidae. Annotated and illustrated catalogue of Recent Cancellariidae. Privately published, Wiesbaden. 428 pp.

External links
 Sowerby, G. B. I. (1832-1833). Cancellaria. In: The Conchological Illustrations. London. Parts 9–13. 5 pls with explanations

Cancellariidae
Gastropods described in 1830